Leonard Patrick O'Connor Wibberley (9 April 1915 – 22 November 1983), who also published under the name Patrick O'Connor, among others, was an Irish author who spent most of his life in the United States. Wibberley, who published more than 100 books, is perhaps best known for five satirical novels about an imaginary country Grand Fenwick, particularly The Mouse That Roared (1955).

Wibberley's adult and juvenile publications cut across the categories of fictional novels, history, and biography. He also wrote short stories (several published in The Saturday Evening Post), plays and long verse poems. Some of his books are in series. Besides the 'Mouse' series, as Leonard Holton, he created the 11-novel 'Father Bredder' mystery series (basis of the television series Sarge) about "a major figure in the clerical crime drama". Among his more than 50 juvenile books are (with Farrar, Straus and Giroux), a seven-volume 'Treegate' series of historical fiction and a four-volume life of Thomas Jefferson. As Patrick O'Connor, he wrote the Black Tiger series on auto racing for young adults. Wibberley also is classified as a science fiction writer.

Throughout the decades, scenes and senses of the sea play important parts in both Wibberley's fiction and nonfiction. Three of his novels have been made into movies: The Mouse That Roared (1959), The Mouse on the Moon (1963), and The Hands of Cormac Joyce (1972).

Biography

In 1915, Leonard Wibberley was born in Dublin, the youngest of six children. His family moved to Cork and, until the age of eight, he was educated in the Irish language at Ring College, Waterford, Ireland. After moving to England, he attended Abbey House, Romsey, Hampshire and then Cardinal Vaughan's Memorial School in London. His father, Thomas Wibberley, FRSA, Professor of Agricultural Research, University College, Cork (one of the three constituents of the National University of Ireland) and Queen's University Belfast, was an experimental agronomist. He wrote several books contending his methods and inventions would allow the UK, absent empire, to feed itself (see Farming on Factory Lines: continuous cropping for the large farmer [London, 1919]). In 1921, the elder Wibberley was made a Fellow of the Linnean Society.
Leonard's second name, "Patrick", was his confirmation name; his third, which he used as one of several pen names, was his matronymic, from his school-teacher mother, Sinaid O'Connor. On his father's sudden death at age fifty in 1930, leaving a widow and six children, Wibberley was obliged to leave school and began a long career in newspapers, in London, as copy boy for the Sunday Dispatch (1931–32), then reporter for the Sunday Express (1932–34) and Daily Mirror (London, 1934–36), and was also assistant London editor for the Malayan Straits Times and the Singapore Free Press. He then emigrated to Trinidad, where he held several jobs, first, briefly, as editor of the Trinidad Evening News (1936), thereafter as an oilfield worker for Trinidad Leaseholds Ltd (1936–43), before immigrating to New York City in 1943. There he was initially employed by Walsh Kaiser Shipyards, but soon found important jobs in journalism again, as Cable Dispatch Editor for the Associated Press (New York City) during the war years of 1943–44 and New York Correspondent and Bureau Chief for the London Evening News (1944–46).

In 1947 Wibberley moved permanently to California, working in newspapers, first (1947) as city editor of the Turlock Daily Journal, then as editor of the Independent Journal, San Rafael (1947–1949), next as copy editor then reporter, for the Los Angeles Times (1950–1954). While working for the Times he began his novel-writing career. At age 37, he published his first novel,The King's Beard (1952). Leaving the newspaper business, he settled permanently in Hermosa Beach, California, as a full-time author, publishing 100 more books, at a rate of at least one a year and averaging more than three. Many were with three publishers: Farrar, Straus and Giroux; William Morrow; Dodd, Mead and Company. The best-known of Wibberley's books, The Mouse that Roared, was kept in print for some time by Bantam Books and then Four Walls Eight Windows. Fifty of his book publications are available as e-books.

Personal life
Wibberley took part in plays, did local radio readings and wrote a weekly syndicated column for the San Francisco Chronicle, 'The Wibberley Papers'. His writing activities included unpublished and uncompleted projects, such as an unfinished 1958 collaboration with his friend Rosalind Russell on a musical script adaptation from his McGillicuddy McGotham, titled "Little Mac" (note picture above). His two marriages, in Trinidad with Olga Morton-Gittens, and in California with Hazel Holton, produced seven children, including film writer Cormac Wibberley; six of the children were with Holton.

Death
Wibberley died of a heart attack in Santa Monica, California, aged 68, on 22 November 1983.

Legacy
Wibberley donated manuscripts and proofs of many of his works to The Leonard Wibberley Archive of the library collections of the University of Southern California, where they are available, but not online.  An online listing, titled "Finding Aid of the Leonard Wibberley papers 0172", has appeared at "The Online Archive of California".

In 1993, Borgo Press published a posthumous book of his last short writings.

Published adult writing

Short stories, novellas

The Saturday Evening Post
 "The Day New York Was Invaded" (25 December 1954; 1, 8, 15, 22, 29 January 1955)
 "The Hands of Cormac Joyce", novelette (issue includes picture of author): 232, n 29 (16 January 1960)
 "The Time of the Lamb" 233 n 26, combined issues ( 24–31 December 1960)
 "The Captive Outfielder": 234, n 12 (21 March 1961)
 "The Ballad of the Pilgrim Cat": 234, n 44 (18 November 1961)
 "The Man Who Lived on Water": 235, n 13 (31 March 1962)
 "Prevarication Jones": 235, n 24 (2 June 1962); repr. Sept.-Oct. 1994
 "Two Angels on Duty": 235, n 28 (28 July 1962); repr. September 1996

The Mouse series
  (e-book, 2015)
 With Cathy Hill (illustrator) (e-book, 2015)
 (e-book, 2015)
 (e-book, 2015)
 (e-book, 2015)

Other novels
 Mrs Searwood's Secret Weapon. Boston: Little, Brown, 1954
 McGillicuddy McGotham. Boston: Little, Brown, 1956; New York: William Morrow, 1966 (e-book, 2016)
 Take Me to Your President. New York: Putnam, 1957 (e-book, 2017)
 The Quest of Excalibur. New York: Putnam, 1959 (republished as e-book Escape from Buckingham Palace, 2018) 
 Stranger At Killknock. New York: Putnam, 1961 (republished in e-book Irish Tales of Faith: The Hands of Cormac Joyce & Stranger at Killknock, 2018)
 A Feast of Freedom. New York: William Morrow, 1964 (e-book, 2016)
 The Island of the Angels. New York: William Morrow, 1964
 The Centurion. New York: William Morrow, 1966 (e-book, 2015)
 The Road from Toomi. New York: William Morrow, 1967
 The Hands of Cormac Joyce. New York: William Morrow, 1967 (republished in e-book Irish Tales of Faith: The Hands of Cormac Joyce & Stranger at Killknock, 2018)
 Adventures of an Elephant Boy. New York: William Morrow, 1968 (e-book, 2017)
 Meeting with a Great Beast. New York: William Morrow, 1971
 Flint's Island: A sequel to 'Treasure Island' . New York: Farrar Straus Giroux, 1972 (e-book, 2015)
 The Testament of Theophilus: a novel of Christ and Caesar. New York: William Morrow, 1972 (published in paperback as The Seven Hills (Major Books, 1973) and in the U.K. as Merchant of Rome (Cassell, 1974), e-book as Body of Proof (2017))
 The Last Stand of Father Felix. New York: William Morrow, 1973
 1776—and All That. New York. William Morrow, 1975
 One in Four. New York: William Morrow, 1976
 Homeward to Ithaka. New York: William Morrow, 1978

As Leonard Holton: Father Joseph Bredder mystery series, Dodd, Mead (New York)
 The Saint Maker, 1959 (e-book, 2015)
 A Pact with Satan, 1960 (e-book, 2016)
 Secret of the Doubting Saint, 1961 (e-book, 2015)
 Deliver Us from Wolves, 1963 (e-book, 2015)
 Flowers by Request, 1964 (e-book, 2015)
 Out of the Depths, 1966 (e-book, 2016)
 A Touch of Jonah, 1968 (e-book, 2016)
 A Problem in Angels, 1970 (e-book, 2016)
 The Mirror of Hell, 1972 (e-book, 2017)
 The Devil to Play, 1974
 A Corner of Paradise, 1977

Non-fiction
 The Trouble with the Irish (or the English, Depending on Your Point of View). New York: Henry Holt, 1956 (e-book, 2020)
 The Coming of the Green. New York: Henry Holt, 1958
 No Garlic in the Soup!: A Portuguese Adventure. New York: Ives Washburn, 1959
 The Land That Isn't There: An Irish Adventure. New York: Ives Washburn, 1960.
 Yesterday's Land: A Baja California Adventure. New York: Ives Washburn, 1961
 Zebulon Pike: Soldier and Explorer. New York: Funk & Wagnalls, 1961
 Ventures into the Deep. New York: Ives Washburn, 1962
 Ah, Julian!: A Memoir of Julian Brodetsky. New York: William Morrow, 1963
 Fiji: Islands of the Dawn. New York: Ives Washburn, 1964
 Toward a Distant Island: A Sailor's Odyssey. New York: Ives Washburn, 1966.
 Hound of the Sea: The Story of a Racing Yacht. New York: Ives Washburn, 1969
 Voyage by Bus: Seeing America by Land Yacht. New York: William Morrow, 1971
 The Shannon Sailors: A Voyage to the Heart of Ireland. New York: William Morrow, 1972
 The Good-Natured Man: A Portrait of Oliver Goldsmith. New York: William Morrow, 1979

Published youth (juvenile) writing

As Christopher Webb, with Funk & Wagnalls, New York
 Mark Toyman's Inheritance, 1960
 The River of Pee Dee Jack, 1962
 Quest of the Otter, 1963
 Matt Tyler's Chronicle, 1966
 The "Ann and Hope" Mutiny, 1966
 Eusebius the Phoenician, 1969

As Patrick O'Connor

Black Tiger series, E.M. Hale (Eau Claire, Wisc.)
 The Black Tiger, 1956 (e-book, 2018)
 Mexican Road Race, 1957 (e-book, 2018)
 Black Tiger at Le Mans, 1958 (e-book, 2018)
 Black Tiger at Bonneville, 1960 (e-book, 2018)
 Black Tiger at Indianapolis, 1962 (e-book, 2018)
 A Car Called Camellia, 1970 (e-book, 2018)

Ives Washburn (New York)
 The Society of Foxes (illus. Clyde N. Geary), 1954
 Flight of the Peacock, 1954
 The Watermelon Mystery, 1955
 Gunpowder for Washington, 1956
 The Lost Harpooner, 1957
 The Five-Dollar Watch Mystery, 1959
 Treasure at Twenty Fathoms, 1961
 The Raising of the Dubhe, 1964
 Seawind from Hawaii, 1965
 South Swell, 1967
 Beyond Hawaii, 1969

Farrar, Straus & Giroux Ariel youth books
 The King's Beard, 1952 (before FS & G bought Ariel)
 The Secret of the Hawk, 1953
 Deadmen's Cave, 1954 (e-book, 2018)
 The Wound of Peter Wayne, 1955
 Kevin O'Connor and the Light Brigade, 1957
 Encounter Near Venus, 1967
 Attar of the Ice Valley, 1968
 Journey to Untor, 1970
 Perilous Gold, 1978
 The Crime of Martin Coverly, 1980

John Treegate series (originally four)
 John Treegate's Musket, 1959 (e-book, 2017)
 Peter Treegate's War, 1960 (e-book, 2013)
 Sea Captain from Salem, 1961 (e-book, 2010)
 Treegate's Raiders, 1962 (e-book, 2017)
 Leopard's Prey, 1971 (included in e-book The Complete Treegate Adventures: From the Birth of the Revolutionary War to the War of 1812, 2018)
 Red Pawns, 1973 (included in e-book The Complete Treegate Adventures: From the Birth of the Revolutionary War to the War of 1812, 2018)
 The Last Battle, 1976 (included in e-book The Complete Treegate Adventures: From the Birth of the Revolutionary War to the War of 1812, 2018)

Non-fictional F S & G books
 The Coronation Book: The dramatic story in its history and legend. Ariel, 1953
 The Epics of Everest, 1955
 The Life of Winston Churchill, 1956
 John Barry—Father of the Navy, 1957
 Wes Powell—Conqueror of the Colorado, 1958
 Guarneri: Story of a Genius, 1974

Life of Thomas Jefferson historical novels
 Young Man from the Piedmont: The Youth of Thomas Jefferson (1963)
 A Dawn in the Trees: Thomas Jefferson, the Years 1776–1789 (1964)
 The Gales of Spring: Thomas Jefferson, the Years 1789–1801 (1965)
 Time of the Harvest: Thomas Jefferson, the Years 1801–1826 (1966)

Other juvenile fiction
 Little League Family. New York: Doubleday, 1978

Collected short works
 Something to Read: A personal selection from his writing by this thoughtful, humorous man. New York: Ives Washburn, 1959

Plays and long verse pieces
 Once, in a Garden: A dramatic full length play. Chicago: Dramatic Publishing Co., 1975. .
 1776—and All That. New York: Morrow, 1975. .
 Black Jack Rides Again. Chicago: Dramatic Publishing Co., 1971. .
 The Gift of a Star, 1969. .
 The Heavenly Quarterback, 1967. .
 The Mouse on Mars, 1972. .
 The Mouse That Roared, 1960. .
 Take Me to Your President, 1957. .
 Two Angels on Duty: A Play in One Act, 1967. . .
 The Shepherd's Reward: A Christmas Legend. New York: Ives Washburn, 1959. .
 The Ballad of the Pilgrim Cat. New York: Ives Washburn, 1962. .

Posthumously published short works

References

External links

 
 The Wibberley Stories compilation of radio readings of short pieces in 1983
 

1915 births
1983 deaths
Irish historical novelists
Irish fantasy writers
Nautical historical novelists
People from County Dublin
20th-century novelists
Writers of historical fiction set in the early modern period
Writers of historical fiction set in the modern age
Irish writers of young adult literature